Hygiene is the fourth studio album by American post-hardcore band Drug Church. The album was released on March 11, 2022, through Pure Noise Records.

Critical reception 

Hygiene received widespread critical acclaim upon its release. On review aggregator website, Metacritic, Hygiene has an average critic score of 82 out of 100, indicating "universal acclaim
based on four critic reviews". Paul Travers writing for British publication Kerrang! gave Hygiene a four out of five-star rating, saying that the album is "as addictively seductive as ever and listening to Hygiene might just be one of the most satisfying things you can do in less than half an hour."

Pitchfork writer, Brad Sanders, awarded Hygiene a 7.4 out of 10 calling it an album "filled with pithy one-liners and gigantic hooks". Sanders compared the album to Turnstile, and specifically their 2021 album Glow On album as far accessibility hardcore music, but more specifically, Sanders said of Hygiene that it "is mired in modern, adult anxieties—the financial pressures of making a living doing what you love, the tough questions that lead to a coherent political view, the complicated friendships that require reexamination. It’s an intimacy built on commiseration rather than communal joy: Drug Church want you to know that they’re in the muck, too, trying to figure it out."

In a positive, but slightly more mixed review, Alex McLevy of The A.V. Club summarized Hygiene called the album "a record wholly unconcerned about how derivative it sounds" and as "reimagined 90s alternative rock, with a hardcore edge". McLevy further described Hygiene as "a formula" with "the most overdriven and anthemic elements of grunge, apply a killer hook, and pour on singer Patrick Kindlon’s exhortatory, provocative hardcore vocals."

Track listing

Personnel 
Drug Church

 Nick Cogan - electric guitar
 Cory Galusha - electric guitar
 Patrick Kindlon - vocals
 Chris Villeneuve - drums
 Patrick Wynne - bass

Additional personnel

 Anne Elisabeth Grushecky - design
 Mike Kalajian - mastering
 Jon Markson - producing, recording, mixing
 Alex Salter - engineering
 Mitchell Wojcik - photography

Charts

References 

2022 albums
Drug Church albums
Pure Noise Records albums